Executive Order 10308 was signed by President Harry S. Truman on December 3, 1951. It was titled Improving the Means for Obtaining Compliance With the Nondiscrimination Provisions of Federal Contracts.  It was replaced by Executive Order 10479 in 1953.

References

External links

 Executive Order 10308 from the U.S. National Archives and Records Administration website.

1951 in law
1951 in the United States
History of civil rights in the United States
Executive orders of Harry S. Truman
History of affirmative action in the United States